ARA is an organization founded as the Academic Research Alliance on February 18, 2001. Currently the organization's name is ara. ARA was originally created to involve students in scientific activities. On October 2004 the organization changed its codes and statutes to develop an attitude of service, leadership, integrity, innovation, and cultural and artistic expression. The organization welcomes anyone who agrees with the organizations purposes, mission, and objectives. One of the main principles of the organization is that information and knowledge should not find any barriers and people should be able to freely access it regardless of sex, race, religion, affiliation, etc.

External links 
ARA - Mexico

Professional associations based in Mexico
Organizations established in 2001
Scholarly communication
2001 establishments in Mexico